Edward Layfield,  D.D. was a Church of England priest in the 17th century.

Layfield was  educated at Merchant Taylors' and St John's College, Oxford. He held Livings at  Ibstock, East Horsley, Wrotham, Chiddingfold, Barnes and All Hallows-by-the-Tower in the City of London. He became a Canon Residentiary of St Paul's Cathedral in 1633; and Archdeacon of Essex in 1634. He died in 1680.

Notes

17th-century English Anglican priests
People educated at Merchant Taylors' School, Northwood
Archdeacons of Essex
Alumni of St John's College, Oxford
1680 deaths